The Transiting Planets and Planetesimals Small Telescope (TRAPPIST) is the corporate name for a pair of Belgian optic robotic telescopes. TRAPPIST–South, which is situated high in the Chilean mountains at ESO's La Silla Observatory, came online in 2010, and TRAPPIST–North situated at the Oukaïmeden Observatory in the Atlas Mountains in Morocco, came online in 2016.

Description 
TRAPPIST is controlled from Liège, Belgium, with some autonomous features. It consists of two  reflecting robotic telescopes located at the ESO La Silla Observatory (housed in the dome of the retired Swiss T70 telescope) in Chile and at Oukaïmeden Observatory in Morocco.

The 60 cm f/8 Ritchey–Chrétien design telescopes and New Technology Mount NTM-500 were built by ASTELCO Systems, a company in Germany. The CCD camera was built by Finger Lakes Instrumentation (USA), providing a 22 x 22 arcminutes field of view. The camera is fitted with a double filter wheel, allowing 12 different filters and one clear position.

The telescope condominium is a joint venture between the University of Liège, Belgium, and Geneva Observatory, Switzerland, and among other tasks, it specializes in searching for comets and exoplanets.

In November 2010, it was one of the few telescopes that observed a stellar occultation of the planetary body Eris, revealing that it may be smaller than Pluto, and it helped observe a stellar occultation by Makemake, when it passed in front of the star NOMAD 1181-0235723. The observations of this event showed it lacked a significant atmosphere.

By utilising transit photometry, they discovered seven terrestrial planets, at least three of which were Earth-sized, orbiting the star; the innermost two were found to be tidally locked to their host star while the outermost appears to lie either within the system's habitable zone or just outside of it. The team published its findings in the May 2016 issue of the Nature journal.

Name 
As with the other space observation projects of the University of Liège like SPECULOOS, Transiting Planets and Planetesimals Small Telescope makes up a backronym, referring to traditional Belgian Trappist beer.

Gallery

See also 

 Carlsberg Meridian Telescope, a high-precision optical astrometry observatory
 SPECULOOS, a project of the University of Liège to search for exoplanets

References

External links 
 Official TRAPPIST website – University of Liège 
 University of Geneva – The Geneva Observatory

Robotic telescopes
Minor-planet discovering observatories
2010 establishments in Chile
Astronomical observatories in Chile